3,4-Dichloromethylphenidate (also known as 3,4-CTMP or 3,4-DCMP) is a stimulant drug related to methylphenidate.  Dichloromethylphenidate is a potent psychostimulant that acts as both a dopamine reuptake inhibitor and norepinephrine reuptake inhibitor, meaning it effectively boosts the levels of the norepinephrine and dopamine neurotransmitters in the brain, by binding to, and partially blocking the transporter proteins that normally remove those monoamines from the synaptic cleft.

3,4-DCMP, the threo-diastereomer, is approximately seven times more potent than methylphenidate in animal studies, but has weaker reinforcing effects due to its slower onset of action. However, H. M. Deutsch's discrimination ratio implies it to be more reinforcing than cocaine.

Legality

As of October 2015 3,4-CTMP is a controlled substance in China.

3,4-CTMP was banned in the UK as a Temporary Class Drug from April 2015 following its unapproved sale as a designer drug.

Sweden's public health agency suggested to classify 3,4-CTMP as hazardous substance on 10 November 2014.

See also 
 3-Bromomethylphenidate
 4-Methylmethylphenidate
 Cilobamine
 Dichloropane
 HDEP-28
 HDMP-28
 Isopropylphenidate
 LR-5182
 O-2390
 Propylphenidate

References 

Stimulants
Designer drugs
2-Piperidinyl compounds
Chloroarenes
Methyl esters